Chehalis Lake is a lake on the Chehalis River in the Lower Mainland of southwestern British Columbia, Canada.  The lake and the river share the name with the community of Chehalis, British Columbia, which is the home of the Sts'Ailes people, a Halqemeylem-speaking Coast Salish group.  Their name Sts'Ailes is said to mean "beating heart"; the similarly named Chehalis, Washington and Chehalis River in that area have a different meaning in the Chehalis language - "sand".

References

Lakes of the Lower Mainland
Douglas Ranges
New Westminster Land District